Russell Mulcahy (born 23 June 1953) is an Australian film director. Mulcahy's work is recognisable by the use of fast cuts, tracking shots and use of glowing lights, neo-noir lighting, windblown drapery, and fans. He directed music videos in the 1980s, worked in television since the early 1990s and directed the films Razorback (1984), Highlander (1986) and Resident Evil: Extinction (2007).

Early life and career
Mulcahy was born in Melbourne.

When he was 14 he received an 8mm camera and began making short films with his friends. After school he began working as a film editor for Australia's Seven Network. He later said he "used to creep in there at 3am and make my own movies". He also acted on stage and was unsure whether to focus on acting or directing. Two of his films won the City Film Festival Award for Best Independent Short Film and he won Best Short Film at the Sydney Film Festival for "Contrived Mind Flashes".

He was approached by the producer of a Seven pop show and asked to film some original footage and compile a music video (then known as a "film clip") to accompany the Harry Nilsson hit "Everybody's Talkin'" (for which no original video was available).

Music videos
Mulcahy soon found that he was in demand as a music video director, and made a number of successful film clips for bands from Australia and New Zealand, including Dragon, Hush and AC/DC, and the classic music video for The Saints' "(I'm) Stranded" (1976).

Tony Hogarth from Woods Records sent Mulcahy to England to do a video for a punk band in Birmingham. It was well received and Mulcahy decided to stay on in the country. He joined Jon Roseman Productions International and made successful music videos for several noted British pop acts—his early UK credits included Culture Club, The Human League, The Stranglers, XTC's "Making Plans for Nigel" (1979), the Sex Pistols and Paul McCartney.

He directed The Vapors' hit "Turning Japanese" (1980) and his landmark video for The Buggles' "Video Killed the Radio Star" (1979) which became the first music video played on MTV in 1981. Mulcahy recalled "Nobody knew the impact that the video would have and how timely it was when we were shooting it. We went into the video with no concept of what it was going to do... It was a one day shoot. I just had this idea of it being set in a strange laboratory, with a girl coming down a tube on a wire."

In 1978, he went to the United States (for Roseman) and directed videos for The Cryers and Candi Staton - where he first used the "jump cut" - under producer Paul Flattery. Other Mulcahy innovations included spot color, body painting, glass matte shots and faux widescreen aspect ratio (first used on his Ultravox and Rod Stewart videos) which have all become standards for the genre.

Mulcahy was a friend of Richard Branson and had done videos for Virgin Records. Branson had an idea for making a film about Derek and Clive and hired Mulcachy to shoot one of their albums over two nights. This became Derek and Clive Get the Horn (1979), Mulcahy's first feature.

For the next few years, Mulcahy focused on music videos, becoming one of the leading directors in the field. In 1980 he joined Lexi Godfrey, Scott Millaney, Brian Grant, and David Mallet to form the video company MGMM. He had notable collaborations in particular with Ultravox, Duran Duran (especially "Hungry Like the Wolf"), Kim Carnes, Icehouse, Spandau Ballet, Fleetwood Mac ("Gypsy") (1982), Billy Joel ("Allentown" & "Matter of Trust"), Bonnie Tyler (including "Total Eclipse of the Heart") (1983), The Motels, Rod Stewart ("Young Turks") (1981) and Elton John.

He has a cameo appearance in the video for "I'm Still Standing" (1983) by Elton John, that he also directed.

Mulcahy later recalled "When people were first asking me to do videos, there was never really a need or a request for a concept. They would just send me a cassette of the song. I'd listen to it with my eyes closed, come up with some ideas and write something down. We'd shoot the video the next day or two days later. It really was just grab what you can and do it."

Warner Bros music chief Jo Berggman called Mulcahy's style "everything but the kitchen sink and more school of video. Russell's work is expensive by music video standards but look at what you get. Wizard of Oz, Singing in the Rain - I mean, name your favorite MGM musical, they're all there."

Mulcahy worked with Duran Duran, directing the key early songs by the band which helped launch them internationally. "We just hit it off," he said. "They were young and brave, as was I really."

In 1982, Mulcahy said he had been approached to make a feature film about a movie palace by David Puttnam, who had success working with first time directors from TV commercials. However, the film was never made.

Feature film director

Razorback
Mulcahy's first dramatic feature was in Australia, Razorback (1984). The film was a box office disappointment but has become a cult favorite. He later said:
From my videos and continuing on through RAZORBACK and after, I've always made sure I have a group around me that are as important as me, and people whose expertise and talent I want and encourage. I want them to be part and parcel of the team and to be proud of their work. I guess there has to be a captain of the ship, but it only takes one crew member to screw everything up. You just encourage everyone to do their best and have fun. The more they feel part of it, and the more fun they have, the day goes faster, and the better the work is.
Mulcahy went back to video clips working with Culture Club, Elton John, Berlin and The Rolling Stones. His work for Duran Duran was particularly acclaimed, including the clip for "Wild Boys", Arena (An Absurd Notion) and the As the Lights Go Down concert video.

Highlander
In 1985, Mulcahy directed the cult film Highlander, starring Christopher Lambert and Sean Connery, featuring music from Queen. Mulcahy said "I loved the genre, I loved the action, and I loved the strange complexity of the intercutting timelines. What really grabbed me though was the sense of tragic, epic romance in the story."

Mulcahy directed several Queen video clips for the Highlander soundtrack (including "A Kind of Magic") as well as works for Billy Joel, Kim Carnes, Kenny Loggins, Def Leppard, Elton John (including "I Don't Wanna Go on with You Like That") and Rod Stewart.

He later directed the Highlander sequel, Highlander II: The Quickening (1991), but disowned it after the completion-bond company interfered with production. He wanted to have his credit changed to Alan Smithee, but as he was not a member of the Directors Guild of America, he had no way of forcing the film-guaranty company to change the credit. He eventually took the opportunity to restore his vision for the film, to a large extent, with the video release of Highlander II: The Renegade Version.

Focus on features
Mulcahy began to focus on features, mostly action/thrillers, such as  Ricochet (1991) with Denzel Washington, Blue Ice (1992) with Michael Caine, The Real McCoy (1993) with Kim Basinger, The Shadow (1994) with Alec Baldwin and Silent Trigger (1996) with Dolph Lundgren.

He was hired by Carolco Pictures to direct Rambo III (1988), but was replaced with second-unit director Peter MacDonald. The collaboration had started well but it became apparent that he had major creative differences with star/writer Sylvester Stallone so Mulcahy left the project. "It was nobody's fault," said Mulcahy later. "Sly is a wonderful man, and we still remain friends."

He continued to direct the occasional video clip for artists like Elton John and began to direct TV shows like Tales from the Crypt, Perversions of Science and The Hunger. He directed the features Tale of the Mummy (1998) and Resurrection (1999), the latter with Christopher Lambert of Highlander.

Later career
In the 21st century, Mulcahy's work was increasingly on the small screen: On the Beach (2000), filmed in Australia based on the novel by Neville Shute; The Lost Battalion (2001), with Rick Schroder; and 1st to Die (2003); he also did episodes of Queer as Folk, The Young Lions, Jeremiah and Skins.

He returned to features with the Australian Swimming Upstream (2003) but mostly directed TV movies, including 3: The Dale Earnhardt Story (2004), Mysterious Island (2005), The Curse of King Tut's Tomb (2006), The Sitter (2007), Crash and Burn (2007), The Scorpion King: Rise of a Warrior (2008), and Prayers for Bobby (2009).

He directed the features Resident Evil: Extinction (2007) and Give 'em Hell Malone (2009).

Mulcahy was a key director on the Teen Wolf TV series throughout its run and also directed episodes of Eye Candy and The Lizzie Borden Chronicles. He returned to features with In Like Flynn (2018).

Personal life
Mulcahy lives in West Hollywood, California, with his partner, David Guzman.

Music videography

Filmography

Feature films
As director
Derek and Clive Get the Horn (1979)
Razorback (1984)
Highlander (1986)
Highlander II: The Quickening (1991)
Ricochet (1991)
Blue Ice (1992)
The Real McCoy (1993)
The Shadow (1994)
Silent Trigger (1996)
Tale of the Mummy (1998)
Resurrection (1999)
Swimming Upstream (2003)
Resident Evil: Extinction (2007)
In Like Flynn (2018)
Teen Wolf: The Movie (2023)

As writer
Bait (2012) (also executive producer)

Concert videos
As the Lights Go Down (1984)
Arena (An Absurd Notion) (1985)

Direct-to-videos
The Scorpion King 2: Rise of a Warrior (2008)
Give 'em Hell, Malone (2009)

Television
TV series

TV movies
On the Beach (2000) 
The Lost Battalion (2001)
3: The Dale Earnhardt Story (2004)
Mysterious Island (2005)
The Curse of King Tut's Tomb (2006)
While the Children Sleep (2007) 
Prayers for Bobby (2009)

Acting credits

References

External links

Russell Mulcahy at the Music Video Database

1953 births
20th-century Australian male writers
21st-century Australian male writers
Australian music video directors
English-language film directors
Film directors from Melbourne
Living people
Writers from Melbourne
Horror film directors
LGBT film directors